My Voice Story is a compilation album by British singer-songwriter from Brighton, Nick Howard. It was released in Germany on 21 December 2012. The album has charted in Germany and Austria. The album is a compilation of all the songs Nick performed the songs on The Voice of Germany.

Singles
 "Unbreakable" was released as the lead single from the album on 7 December 2012. The song has charted in Germany, Austria and Switzerland.

Track listing

Chart performance

Release history

References

2012 albums
Nick Howard albums